The 1998 Shanghai Open was a men's tennis tournament played on outdoor hard courts in Shanghai, China that was part of the World Series of the 1998 ATP Tour. It was the third edition of the tournament and was held from 5 October until 12 October 1998. Second-seeded Michael Chang won the singles title.

Finals

Singles

 Michael Chang defeated  Goran Ivanišević, 4–6, 6–1, 6–2
 It was Chang's 2nd singles title of the year and the 33rd of his career.

Doubles

 Mahesh Bhupathi /  Leander Paes defeated  Todd Woodbridge /  Mark Woodforde, 6–4, 6–7, 7–6

References

External links
 ITF tournament edition details

Shanghai Open
Kingfisher Airlines Tennis Open
Sports competitions in Shanghai
1998 in Chinese tennis
October 1998 sports events in Asia
1990s in Shanghai